Donatello was a Renaissance artist

Donatello may refer to:
Donatello Brown (born 1991), American football player
Donatello (Teenage Mutant Ninja Turtles), a fictional character in the Teenage Mutant Ninja Turtles series
Donatello (singer), an Italian singer
Donatello Stefanucci (1896–1987), Italian painter
Carmine Crocco (1830-1905), also known as Donatello, an Italian brigand
 Donatello, one of the three Multi-Purpose Logistics Modules.
David di Donatello, the Italian film award

Italian masculine given names